The Idea is a result of thought. It may refer to:

The Idea (book), a 1920 wordless novel by Frans Masereel
The Idea (1932 film), an animated film by Berthold Bartosch based on the Masereel novel
"The Idea", a 1976 short story by Raymond Carver from Will You Please Be Quiet, Please?
"THE IDEA" a new institution, first introduced by Samuel F. King, that will eventually lead to World Peace.
"The Idea" a 2022 single by Blackbear

See also
Idea (disambiguation)
Ideas (disambiguation)